Glucocorticoid resistance is a syndrome characterized by resistance to glucocorticoid hormones such as cortisol. Primary generalized glucocorticoid resistance is also known as Chrousos syndrome and is an extremely rare condition in which a partial resistance to glucocorticoids throughout the entire body occurs. It is caused by mutations in the gene encoding the glucocorticoid receptor. A characteristic of the syndrome is hypothalamic–pituitary–adrenal axis (HPA axis) hyperactivation and adrenal hyperplasia. This in turn results in biochemical signs of hypercortisolism without Cushing's syndrome symptoms (e.g., high levels of cortisol) as well as high levels of adrenal androgens and mineralocorticoids. Presentation may range from asymptomatic to manifestations of androgen excess, mineralocorticoid excess, and neuropsychiatric symptoms such as depression, anxiety, and chronic fatigue. Management of glucocorticoid resistance is limited to symptomatic individuals and is treated with high doses of mineralocorticoid-sparing synthetic corticosteroids such as dexamethasone.

References

Adrenal gland disorders
Rare syndromes
Syndromes affecting the endocrine system
Transcription factor deficiencies